Arabs in France are those parts of the Arab diaspora who have immigrated to France, as well as their descendants. Subgroups include Algerians in France, Moroccans in France, Mauritanians in France, Tunisians in France and Refugees of the Syrian Civil War. This French subgroup of Arabs in Europe are concentrated in the Maghrebi communities of Paris.

Demographics
French people of Arab and Amazigh/African origin (predominantly from Maghreb but also some from Mashreq areas of the Arab world) in France forms the second largest ethnic group after French people of French origin.               
                      
There are no official figures concerning the demographics of French people of Arab/African descent because ethnic statistics are forbidden in France.                           
                                           
Most immigration was in 1960 and 1970, a period of economic growth, but many of them managed to bring their families after 1970. They have settled mainly in the industrial regions in France, especially the Paris region, but also in Marseille and other places.

Notable people

Maghrebis
Many notable French people have Maghrebi ancestry since Arabs in France are predominantly Maghrebis.

Politics 
 Arnaud Montebourg, politician, former Minister of the Economy, and candidate for the Socialist Party's presidential nomination
 Azouz Begag, sociologist and politician for various parties, e.g. Mouvement Démocrate
 Kader Arif, former Minister of Veterans and current Member of the European Parliament
 Bariza Khiari, Member of the French Senate (Socialist Party)
 Myriam El Khomri, Minister of Labor (Socialist Party)
 Rachida Dati, Member of the European Parliament, Mayor of the 7th arrondissement of Paris and former Minister of Justice (Union for a Popular Movement)

Writers 
 Tahar Ben Jelloun, Prix Goncourt laureate

Media 
 Karim Rissouli, TV presenter of political show C politique
 Cyril Hannouna, talk show host and television personality

Entertainment
Fashion
 Hedi Slimane, former head designer of Yves Saint-Laurent 
Cinema
 Tahar Rahim, actor
 Dany Boon, actor, comedian, and filmmaker
 Hafsia Herzi, actress
 Abdellatif Kechiche, filmmaker, actor and screenwriter; Palme d'Or laureate
 Roschdy Zem, award-winning actor
 Leïla Bekhti, actress
 Ismaël Ferroukhi, film director
 Kad Merad, award-winning actor, comedian, and film director
 Rachid Bouchareb, film director
 Nabil Ayouch, film director and producer
 Sabrina Ouazani, actress
 Jamel Debbouze, actor, comedian, film director 
 Yasmine Belmadi, actor
 Ramzy Bedia, actor
 Salim Kéchiouche, actor
 Rayane Bensetti, actor
Music
L'Algerino
 DJ Mehdi
 Cheb Khaled
 Wallen
 Amel Bent
 Amina Annabi
 Indila
 Najoua Belyzel
 Kayna Samet
 Lââm
 Chico Bouchikhi 
 Rachid Taha
 Faudel
 DJ Abdel
 Freeman
 Rim'K
 Mister You
 Niro
 Tunisiano
 Ali
 Médine
 La Fouine
 Nessbeal
 Lacrim
 Kamelanc'
 Sinik

Sports
 Adil Rami, football player for AC Milan
 Amine Adli
 Amine Harit
 Samir Nasri, football player for Manchester City
 Mehdi Benatia, football player for Bayern München
 Hatem Ben Arfa, football player for Newcastle United
 Mahiedine Mekhissi-Benabbad, middle-distance runner 
 Bouabdellah Tahri, middle-distance and long-distance runner
 Habib Bellaïd
 Houssem Aouar
 Ismaël Bennacer
 Ismaël Gharbi
 Kays Ruiz-Atil
 Kevin Malcuit
 Matteo Guendouzi
 Mounir Chouiar
 Noah Fatar
 Rayan Aït-Nouri
 Samir Hadji
 Samir Malcuit
 Younes Belhanda
 Zinedine Zidane, football player on the France National Team
 Karim Benzema, football player on the France National Team
 Karim Soltani
 Karim Ziani
 Yacine Adli
 Yohan Benalouane
 Younes Kaboul

Mashrekis
Many notable French people are of Mashreki ancestry mainly of Lebanese descent.

Politics
Éric Besson, politician
Élie Aboud, Member of the National Assembly (Union for a Popular Movement)
Henri Jibrayel, Member of the National Assembly (Socialist Party)
Antoine Karam, French Guiana's representative in the French Senate (Socialist Party)
Serge Ayoub

Business
Carlos Ghosn
Jacques Saadé

Scientists
André Choulika
Eid Hourany

Journalism
Antoine Sfeir
Léa Salamé, journalist and political commentator

Architecture
Nabil Gholam

Writers
Andrée Chedid, novelist; Prix Goncourt laureate
Amin Maalouf
Gilbert Achcar

Entertainment
Cinema
Philippe Aractingi
Thomas Langmann
Jean-Pierre Rassam
Julien Rassam
Music
Matthieu Chedid
RAmez
Abdel Rahman El Bacha
Warda Al-Jazairia
Ibrahim Maalouf
Louis Chedid
Guy Béart
Fashion
Reem Acra

Sports
Ali Hallab
 Rayan Helal
 William Saliba

See also
Arab diaspora
Racism in France
Demographics of France
Berbers in France
Lebanese diaspora
Syrian diaspora
Tunisian diaspora
Palestinian diaspora
Moroccan diaspora
Iraqi diaspora
Egyptian diaspora

References

 
Arab diaspora in Europe
Ethnic groups in France
 
Muslim communities in Europe
North African diaspora in France
Middle Eastern diaspora in France